KLCB (1230 AM) is a radio station licensed to serve Libby, Montana.  The station is owned by Lincoln County Broadcasters. It airs a country music format.

KLCB and KTNY share studios at 251 W Cedar St. in Libby. They also share a transmitter site south of town on Spencer Road.

In addition to its usual music programming, KLCB carries national and local news, a swap and shop program, plus Libby Loggers football and men's and women's basketball games.

The station was assigned the KLCB call letters by the Federal Communications Commission. The call sign stands for the corporate owner Lincoln County Broadcasters.

References

External links
KLCB official website

LCB
Country radio stations in the United States
Radio stations established in 1950
Lincoln County, Montana